Chashni (transl. Sweet Syrup) is an Indian Hindi-language television drama series premiered on 9 March 2023 on Star Plus and streams digitally on Disney+ Hotstar. It stars Amandeep Sidhu, Srishti Singh and Sai Ketan Rao in the lead roles.

Premise
An untoward incident mars the loving relationship between two sisters- Chandni and Roshni. Years later, fate brings them face to face only to find out that they are daughter-in-law and mother-in-law for each other. Thus, begins a typical saas-bahu saga.

Plot

Cast

Main
 Amandeep Sidhu as Chandni Chopra: A firefighter, Roshni’s elder sister, Sanjay's daughter, Raunaq neighbour, Manav's love interest. (2023)
 Srishti Singh as Roshni Chopra: Chandni’s younger sister,  Sanjay's daughter, Raunaq neighbour, Nirbhay's love interest. (2023)
 Sai Ketan Rao as Raunaq Reddy: Mr.Reddy's son, Chandni and Roshni's neighbour (2023)

Recurring
 Vandana Vithlani (2023)
 Jatin Singh Jamwal (2023)
 Hitanshu Jinsi as ACP Manav (2023)
 Sumeet Sachdev as Mr.Reddy: Raunaq's father (2023)
 Anahita Jahanbakah (2023)
 Snehal Reddy (2023)
 Rutuja Sawant (2023)
 Trishaan Maini (2023)
 Vikas Verma (2023)
 Aryan Arora as Nirbhay Dhillon: Roshni's love interest (2023)
 Aliraza Namdar as Sanjay Chopra: Chandni and Roshni's father (2023)

Production

Casting
Srishti Singh was cast as Roshni Chopra. She made her television debut with Chashni. Talking about playing a mother-in-law, she said, "Aishwarya Rai's character Paro from 'Devdas' is my inspiration for my character Roshni who plays the role of a Saas. I aim to mould my character of the saas in the shape, etiquette, and mannerisms, of the way Aishwarya has depicted herself in the film. I admire the way Paro has become a household name and I hope I receive the same amount of appreciation and love from the audience for Roshni."

Amandeep Sidhu was cast as the female lead. She on essaying a role of firefighter in the show, said, "I have always played the character of the girl next door, but playing a firefighter is going to be special as I will be serving my nation, be it in real life or on screen, and I always wanted to play this type of character."

Promotion
The leads Sidhu and Singh travelled in Mumbai Locals as a part of awareness campaign for the show.

See also 
 List of programmes broadcast by StarPlus

References 

2023 Indian television series debuts
2020s Indian television series
Hindi-language television shows
StarPlus original programming